Jordan Haworth Peele (born February 21, 1979) is an American actor, comedian, and filmmaker. He is best known for his film and television work in the comedy and horror genres. Peele started his career in sketch comedy before transiting his career as a writer and director of psychological horror and satirical films. In 2017, Peele was included on the annual Time 100 list of the most influential people in the world.

Peele's breakout role came in 2003, when he was hired as a cast member on the Fox sketch comedy series Mad TV, where he spent five seasons, leaving the show in 2008. In the following years, he and his frequent Mad TV collaborator, Keegan-Michael Key, created and starred in their own Comedy Central sketch comedy series Key & Peele (2012–2015). The series was critically acclaimed, winning two Primetime Emmy Awards and a Peabody Award. The two wrote, produced, and starred in the comedy film Keanu (2016) and appeared in various projects since.

His 2017 directorial debut, the horror film Get Out, was a critical and box office success, for which he received numerous accolades, including the Academy Award for Best Original Screenplay, along with nominations for Best Picture and Best Director. Critics have frequently named Get Out as one of the best films of the 21st century. He received another Academy Award nomination for Best Picture for producing Spike Lee's drama BlacKkKlansman (2018). He directed, wrote, and produced the acclaimed films Us (2019) and Nope (2022). He founded the film and television production company Monkeypaw Productions in 2012. He wrote and produced Candyman (2021), and Wendell and Wild (2022).

Peele has also voice acted in the animated film Captain Underpants: The First Epic Movie (2017) and in the adult animated sitcom Big Mouth (2017–present). He co-created the TBS comedy series The Last O.G. (2018–2022) and the YouTube Premium comedy series Weird City (2019). He also served as the host and producer of the CBS All Access revival of the anthology series The Twilight Zone (2019–2020).

Early life
Jordan Haworth Peele was born in New York City on February 21, 1979. His mother, Lucinda Williams, is white, from Maryland. His father, Hayward Peele, Jr. (died 1999), was African American, and originally from North Carolina. Peele last saw his father when he was seven years old, and was raised by his single mother on Manhattan's Upper West Side. He attended the Computer School in Manhattan, graduated from The Calhoun School on Manhattan's Upper West Side in 1997 after securing a scholarship to attend the private school, and went on to Sarah Lawrence College where he majored in puppetry. After two years, Peele dropped out to form a comedy duo with Sarah Lawrence classmate and future Key & Peele writer Rebecca Drysdale.

Peele had been a cinephile ever since he was a young child and decided at 12 that he wanted to be a film director, citing Glory, Edward Scissorhands, Thelma & Louise, and Aliens as films that had a strong effect on him.

Career

2002–2016: Television success 
Peele regularly performed at Boom Chicago in Amsterdam and The Second City in Chicago. He and Nicole Parker were well known for their musical duets at Boom Chicago. He portrayed a popular character called "Danish Supermodel Ute" during his time at Boom Chicago and hosted MTV's Comedy Weekend in 2002.

In 2003, Peele joined the cast of Mad TV for its ninth season. Around the time Keegan-Michael Key joined the cast as a featured performer, it was assumed that Key would be chosen over Peele. The two of them ultimately were cast together after showing great comedic chemistry. Peele performed celebrity impersonations, which included favorites Caroll Spinney (as the voice of Big Bird from Sesame Street), Ja Rule, James Brown, Flavor Flav, Justin Guarini, Montel Williams, Morgan Freeman, Timbaland, and Forest Whitaker. Peele was absent from the first four episodes of his second season on Mad TV. He made a cameo in "Weird Al" Yankovic's video "White & Nerdy" with Mad TV co-star Keegan-Michael Key. After five seasons on Mad TV, Peele left the cast at the end of the 13th season.Peele was nominated for a 2008 Emmy Award for his song "Sad Fitty Cent", a music video parody about 50 Cent lamenting over his rivalry with Kanye West. The lyrics were, according to the music video, written by Peele, and he was involved in arranging its music. In 2009, he appeared in Little Fockers. He appeared in a viral video titled "Hillary vs Obama" (which was shown as a Mad TV sketch) where he and a Hillary Clinton supporter (played by short-term cast member Lisa Donovan) argue over whether Hillary Clinton or Barack Obama would make a better president, only to get upstaged by a Rudy Giuliani supporter (played by Donovan's brother, Ben). Peele auditioned to be a cast member for Saturday Night Live when SNL producers were looking for someone to play Barack Obama (around the time when SNL and Mad TV — and other scripted shows — were put on hiatus due to the 2007–2008 Writers Guild of America strike).

In 2010, Peele co-starred in the Fox comedy pilot The Station, and appeared with a recurring role in the Adult Swim series Childrens Hospital. He had a supporting role in the David Wain-directed comedy Wanderlust, which was released in 2012. Peele and his former Mad TV castmate and friend Keegan-Michael Key starred in their own Comedy Central sketch series Key & Peele, from 2012 to 2015. The series was a success with viewers, and spawned several skits and videos that went viral online.

In 2014, Peele played an FBI agent in the first season of the FX anthology series Fargo, inspired by the 1996 film of the same name. In 2016, Peele starred in and produced, with Key, the first feature film in which the two both had leading roles, Keanu (they had previously both appeared in Wanderlust). The film received generally favorable reviews from critics.

2017–present: Success as a filmmaker 
In February 2017, Peele's first film, Get Out, was released to critical acclaim, eventually scoring a 98% rating on Rotten Tomatoes. The film received universal acclaim for Peele's screenplay and direction, as well as the performance of its lead, Daniel Kaluuya, and was chosen by the National Board of Review, the American Film Institute, and Time magazine as one of the top 10 films of the year. The Atlantic called the film "a subversive horror masterpiece". Get Out proved to be popular with movie audiences, and it eventually became one of the most profitable horror films, and films of 2017, and grossed over $255 million on a budget of $4.5 million. For his work on the film, Peele received significant attention, as well as numerous accolades, including the Bingham Ray Breakthrough Director Award at the 2017 Gotham Independent Film Awards. The film also received four nominations at the 90th Academy Awards: Best Picture, Best Director and Best Original Screenplay nominations for Peele, as well as a Best Actor nomination for Kaluuya. Peele won the Academy Award for Best Original Screenplay, becoming the first African-American screenwriter to win in this category. He became the third person, after Warren Beatty and James L. Brooks, to be nominated for Best Picture, Best Director, and Best Original Screenplay for a debut film, and the first black person to receive them for any one film. Get Out also earned him the Writers Guild of America Award for Best Original Screenplay, as well as nominations for a Directors Guild of America Award and a BAFTA Award for Best Original Screenplay. The success prompted his Monkeypaw Productions company to a first look deal with Universal Pictures.

In early 2018 Peele announced his intention to retire from acting, stating in an interview with CBS "Acting is just nowhere near as fun for me as directing". In 2018, Peele co-created the TBS comedy series The Last O.G., starring Tracy Morgan and Tiffany Haddish. Also in 2018, Peele co-produced the Spike Lee film, BlacKkKlansman which was released to critical acclaim and was a box office success. The film received six nominations at the 91st Academy Awards including the Best Picture nomination for Peele. On June 28, 2018, it was announced that YouTube Premium would be releasing Weird City, co-created by Peele and Charlie Sanders. The show was released on February 13, 2019, to critical acclaim. On April 5, 2018, it was announced that Amazon Video had given a four-episode order for Lorena, a docuseries about Lorena Bobbitt. The series was set to be directed by Joshua Rofé who would also executive produce alongside Peele, Win Rosenfeld, Steven J. Berger, Jenna Santoianni, and Tom Lesinski. Production companies involved with the series include Monkeypaw Productions, Sonar Entertainment, and Number 19. It ultimately premiered on February 15, 2019.

Peele's second film as director was Us, a horror-thriller film which he also wrote and produced, starring Lupita Nyong'o, Winston Duke, Elisabeth Moss, and Tim Heidecker. After having its world premiere on March 8, the film was released in the United States on March 22, 2019, by Universal Pictures, Monkeypaw Productions, and QC Entertainment. Peele developed and is narrator for the science fiction web television series The Twilight Zone, the third revival of the original 1959–64 anthology series that aired on CBS, for CBS All Access. The show premiered on April 1, 2019, with Peele, Simon Kinberg and Marco Ramirez as executive producers. In February 2020, Peele produced a 10-episode series about hunting down Nazis called Hunters. Peele produced the HBO series Lovecraft Country written by Underground co-creator Misha Green.

Peele co-produced and co-wrote the 2021 sequel to Candyman, through his Monkeypaw Productions, of which Candyman star Tony Todd stated in a 2018 interview with Nightmare on Film Street, "I'd rather have him do it, someone with intelligence, who's going to be thoughtful and dig into the whole racial makeup of who Candyman is and why he existed in the first place." Universal and MGM partnered with Win Rosenfeld to co-produce the film with Peele, and Nia DaCosta directed. The new Candyman serves as a "spiritual sequel", taking place back in the gentrified Cabrini Green, where housing projects once stood in Chicago. After multiple delays, the movie was theatrically released on August 27, 2021, to positive reviews.

Peele's next film, Nope, was released on July 22, 2022.

On November 3, 2015, it was reported that Henry Selick was developing Wendell & Wild, a new stop-motion feature with Jordan Peele and Keegan-Michael Key based on an original story by Selick. In March 2018, the film was picked up by Netflix.

Future projects 
There have been several films floated based on Peele's sketch comedy series Key & Peele. In March 2015, it was announced that Key would reprise the role of Mr. Garvey in a feature-length film Substitute Teacher with Peele portraying a rival teacher. In March 2017 in a Reddit AMA, Peele expressed interest in developing a film around his Key & Peele character Wendell Sanders based on the music video "The Power of Wings". The film, titled Wendell Meets Middle-Earth, would follow Wendell's existence in the fantasy world that he likes to see his life in. In October 2020, Rosenfeld and Peele signed on to produce the remake of Wes Craven's 1991 comedy horror film The People Under the Stairs. It is reported that his Monkeypaw Productions company has struck a deal with Universal Television.

Influences
In February 2017, Peele curated the Brooklyn Academy of Music film series "The Art of the Social Thriller", comprising 12 films that inspired the making of Get Out, including the horror films Rosemary's Baby, Night of the Living Dead, The Shining, Candyman, The People Under the Stairs, Scream, The Silence of the Lambs, Funny Games, Misery, the thrillers Rear Window and The 'Burbs, and the comedy drama Guess Who's Coming to Dinner.

As a filmmaker, Peele has cited his influences as being Steven Spielberg, Alfred Hitchcock, Stanley Kubrick, and M. Night Shyamalan.

As a comedian, Peele counts among his influences In Living Color, Richard Pryor and Dave Chappelle. He also has listed Steve Martin and Martin Lawrence as arguably his two biggest influences.

Personal life
Through his mother, Lucinda Williams, Peele is descended from the colonial Woodhull family, whose members include Brigadier General Nathaniel Woodhull and Culper Ring Spy Abraham Woodhull (the latter of whom is his first cousin, 8 times removed).

Peele began dating Chelsea Peretti in 2013. They became engaged in November 2015, and Peretti announced in April 2016 that she and Peele had eloped. They have a son named Beaumont (born July 1, 2017).

Filmography 

As filmmaker

Awards and nominations

Peele has been nominated for four Academy Awards: Best Picture, Best Director, and Best Original Screenplay for Get Out (2017), winning the latter, and another Best Picture nomination for BlacKkKlansman (2018). He has also been nominated for two British Academy Film Awards, two Golden Globe Awards, and won one Primetime Emmy Award.

References

External links

 
 
Peele's production practice Monkeypaw Productions

1979 births
Living people
20th-century American comedians
20th-century American male actors
20th-century American male writers
21st-century American comedians
21st-century American male actors
21st-century American male writers
African-American male comedians
African-American film directors
African-American film producers
African-American male actors
African-American screenwriters
American film production company founders
American impressionists (entertainers)
American male comedians
American male film actors
American male screenwriters
American male television actors
American male voice actors
American sketch comedians
Best Original Screenplay Academy Award winners
Comedians from New York City
Directors Guild of America Award winners
Film directors from New York City
Film producers from New York (state)
Horror film directors
Independent Spirit Award for Best Director winners
Male actors from New York City
Nebula Award winners
Peabody Award winners
People from the Upper West Side
Primetime Emmy Award winners
Sarah Lawrence College alumni
Screenwriters from New York (state)
Television producers from New York City
Woodhull family
Writers Guild of America Award winners
Postmodernist filmmakers